Trevor Simsby (born October 13, 1992) is an American professional golfer.

Simsby won the rain-shortened Bandar Malaysia Open on the Asian Tour in a playoff. This was the final event on tour for the calendar year of 2020 as the remaining events were cancelled due to the COVID-19 pandemic. With only a handful of events played in that season, Simsby was in the top-two of money earners on tour, qualifying him for the 2021 WGC-Workday Championship. The previous season, Simsby played on the Asian Development Tour.

Amateur wins
2012 PAC-12 Preview

Source:

Professional wins (1)

Asian Tour wins (1)

*Note: The 2020 Bandar Malaysia Open was shortened to 54 holes due to weather.

Asian Tour playoff record (1–0)

Results in World Golf Championships

1Cancelled due to COVID-19 pandemic

"T" = Tied
NT = No tournament

References

External links

American male golfers
Washington Huskies men's golfers
Asian Tour golfers
Golfers from California
Sportspeople from Carlsbad, California
1992 births
Living people